Maxime Omer Mathieu Decugis or Décugis (24 September 1882 – 6 September 1978) was a tennis player from France who held the French Championships record of winning the tournament eight times (a French club members only tournament before 1925), a feat that was surpassed by Rafael Nadal in 2014. He also won three Olympic medals at the 1900 Summer Olympics (Paris) and the 1920 Summer Olympics (Antwerp), his only gold medal coming in the mixed doubles partnering French legend Suzanne Lenglen.

Life

Decugis' father was a merchant at Les Halles, the company's name was Omer Décugis et fils, however the accent mark on the é is missing from Max Decugis' birth certificate, and appears inconsistently in later English-speaking sources such as the Ayres' Almanacks edited by Arthur Wallis Myers, but apparently never in any French-speaking sources. The origin of the family name Décugis, spelled with accented é in an 1842 source, is "from Cuges-les-Pins."

In 1905 he married Marie Flameng, the daughter of painter François Flameng, in Paris. After the death of Marie in 1969, Max married Suzanne Louise Duval in October.

Career

Decugis won the French Championships in 1903, 1904, 1907, 1908, 1909, 1912, 1913, and 1914 (also 14 times in doubles and seven times in mixed). The interruption of World War I denied Decugis the opportunity to defend his 1914 title. Decugis was also a four-time runner-up, having lost the final in 1902, 1906, 1920, and 1923. He won the International German Championship in 1901 and 1902.

In major tournaments, Decugis reached the semifinals of both the 1911 and 1912 Wimbledon Championships and the 1913 and 1914 World Hard Court Championships (WHCC) and the final of the World Covered Court Championship (WCCC) in 1919. He won the mixed doubles title at the WHCC on four occasions (1912, 1913, 1914, 1921) and at the WCCC on two (1913, 1919).

In May 1910, Decugis twice defeated Anthony Wilding at Wiesbaden, first in the final of the Wiesbaden Cup in four sets, followed by a victory in the final of the Wiesbaden Championship in three straight sets.

A. Wallis Myers of The Daily Telegraph ranked Decugis as world No. 10 in both 1913 and 1914.

Grand Slam finals

Doubles: 2 (1 titles, 1 runner-up)

See also
 List of French Men's Singles champions and finalists

References

External links
 
 

1882 births
1978 deaths
French male tennis players
Olympic gold medalists for France
Olympic silver medalists for France
Olympic bronze medalists for France
Olympic medalists in tennis
Olympic tennis players of France
Tennis players at the 1900 Summer Olympics
Tennis players at the 1906 Intercalated Games
Tennis players at the 1920 Summer Olympics
Grand Slam (tennis) champions in men's doubles
Tennis players from Paris
Medalists at the 1900 Summer Olympics
Medalists at the 1906 Intercalated Games
Medalists at the 1920 Summer Olympics
Wimbledon champions (pre-Open Era)